CSBM may refer to:
 Colegio San Benito
 Confidence and Security Building Measures, implemented by the Vienna Document